Bullseye is a supervillain appearing in American comic books published by Marvel Comics. The character was created by Marv Wolfman and John Romita Sr.. A psychopathic assassin, Bullseye uses the opportunities afforded by his line of work to exercise his homicidal tendencies and to work out his own personal vendetta against Daredevil. He is also an enemy of the Punisher. Although he possesses no superpowers, Bullseye is able to use almost any object as a lethal projectile, be it weapons like shuriken and sai or seemingly harmless objects like playing cards and pencils. His marksmanship is uncanny, at a nearly supernatural level.

The character has been adapted into various forms of media relating to Daredevil. He has been portrayed by Colin Farrell in the 2003 film adaptation and by Wilson Bethel as Benjamin "Dex" Poindexter in the 2018 third season of the Marvel Cinematic Universe Daredevil television adaptation, a name notably used in the Ultimate Marvel Universe comics version of the character and which was later integrated into the mainstream comics.

Publication history
The character's first appearance is in Daredevil  #131 (March 1976). Although created by writer Marv Wolfman and artist John Romita Sr., the book features art by Bob Brown and Klaus Janson.

Bullseye's real name and origins are unknown. He has used the name "Benjamin Poindexter" on several occasions, first mentioned on Daredevil #159 (1979) where he goes by the name "Mr. Poindexter" which he later claimed that it is "just one of the many names he used" (Daredevil #181, 1982). However, there are also instances where his name is given as “Lester". The miniseries Bullseye: Greatest Hits (2004) developed the character's backstory, but also revealed that some or all of it has been fabricated, probably by Bullseye himself. In this series, Bullseye's name was Leonard and had a brother named Nate (whose real name was later revealed as Lester by Leonard).

Following Civil War, Warren Ellis took over writing Thunderbolts and Bullseye became one of the core members of the new team line-up.

In the Secret Invasion aftermath storyline Dark Reign, Bullseye becomes a member of the Dark Avengers under the alias Hawkeye and features in a five-issue limited series Dark Reign: Hawkeye, written by Andy Diggle, with art by Tom Raney. As a member of the Dark Avengers, he has a major role in the crossover Dark Avengers/Uncanny X-Men: Utopia, written by Matt Fraction. He appeared as a regular character in Dark Avengers #1-16 (March 2009-June 2010).

Bullseye is killed by Daredevil in Shadowland #1, but is later confirmed alive in Daredevil vol. 3 #26.

Fictional character biography

Early life and backstory
Bullseye grew up in The Bronx, where he lived with his brother and their abusive father. His brother's main form of recreation was playing with rifles, leading him to become an expert shot. When he was 10 years old, his brother started a fire in their home in an unsuccessful attempt to kill their father. Shortly thereafter, Bullseye was placed in a foster home, and became a baseball player in high school. He was an extremely talented pitcher, and was offered a scholarship, but instead opted to enter the minor leagues. After three games, he was called up to play a sold-out Major League game. He had surrendered no hits the entire game, and in the bottom of the ninth with two outs, he became bored and requested the coach pull him from the game. The coach refused, and insisted that he finish the game. The opposing team's batter mocked him, accusing him of cowardice. Bullseye threw the ball at his head, killing him. As the ball struck, he said only one word: "Bullseye". He was barred from professional baseball and convicted of manslaughter.

This is a retcon of a previous origin story, which depicts Bullseye growing up as a below average student in a trailer park with an alcoholic, physically abusive father. In this version of events, Bullseye fakes his father's suicide using a handgun set off by a toy arrow. It is unclear how many elements of this version are actually true.

His cold demeanor and unique skills, however, meant subsequent recruitment by the National Security Agency as an assassin was inevitable, and he was soon assigned to train Contras in Nicaragua. By the time he arrived, however, he claimed to have already been planning to leave the NSA. He had planned on robbing the Contras blind and fleeing, but soon discovered they were desperately poor. Bullseye made the best of the situation: within seven hours of being informed of their poverty, he had led the Contras in seizing a landing strip that the Colombian cocaine smugglers were using as a staging area before moving on to the United States. Without use of the airfield, the smugglers were unable to send new shipments. Bullseye set up his hapless Nicaraguan translator Paolo as the leader of the new force controlling the airfield, and let the word spread around; however, Paolo was nothing but a patsy. Bullseye planned to invite several organized crime heads to the airfield to broker a new deal with him as Paolo's supposed "right-hand man". He would take their money and disappear, presumably leaving Paolo to suffer the wrath of the Mafia, Russian Mafia, Yakuza, and various other criminal elements. However, before the deal could be finalized, the Punisher (Frank Castle) arrived.

Castle killed all the organized crime leaders in a fiery explosion from which Bullseye barely escaped. The two engaged in a fierce battle in which Bullseye was able to wound the Punisher and evade or disable several of his weapons. Bullseye then used some blood-reddened mud to paint a bull's-eye on his forehead, mocking Castle's inability to hit him. The fight concluded when Drug Enforcement Administration agents arrived, and the Punisher fled. Bullseye turned himself in to the D.E.A. agents and soon was assigned to infiltrate the Kingpin's criminal empire. He obtained a costume, fled yet again, and became one of the most dangerous hitmen in the world.

All of the above information is given by Bullseye during a subsequent interrogation by US intelligence. Just prior to escaping from custody, Bullseye confesses he made up some or all of his story to amuse himself; for example, he claims that he was really the one who started the fire which burned down his childhood home. The whole capture was a plan by the assassin to gain access to the prison where his father is being held. Bullseye finally gets revenge on his father, leaving him to burn as the prison's security systems torch everything inside.

Costumed criminal career
Bullseye battles (and defeats) Daredevil at a circus to establish his reputation as an extortionist. Shortly after, Daredevil by chance overhears him in the midst of an extortion attempt and captures him. Bullseye is later hired by Maxwell Glenn to kill Matt Murdock and Foggy Nelson, and Daredevil interferes. Although Bullseye wins again, Daredevil escapes death, and Bullseye's professional reputation is damaged as a result. Seeking to regain his credibility, he challenges Daredevil on live television, but is soundly defeated.

Smarting from this even harsher blow to his reputation, Bullseye hires Eric Slaughter's gang and kidnaps the Black Widow (Natasha Romanoff) to bait Daredevil into a revenge bout. Daredevil defeats him again, and the despair of this repeated humiliation drives him to a mental breakdown. It is later revealed that this breakdown was in part caused by a brain tumor, which begins causing migraines, paranoia and hallucinations that everyone he meets is Daredevil. He escapes from prison, but is recaptured by Daredevil, and the tumor is successfully removed. The tumor's symptoms quickly disappear, and defense lawyers are able to have him freed on the argument that his criminal behavior was caused solely by the brain tumor. He is hired to assassinate the Kingpin, but meets with repeated failure. Inexplicably, this convinces the Kingpin to employ him as a chief assassin, but he is fired the same day he witnesses the Kingpin's humiliating defeat at Daredevil's hands. Bullseye's repeated failed attempts to regain this briefly-held position became a running joke of the Daredevil series.

While in prison, he learns that the Kingpin has employed Elektra (Daredevil's former lover) as a new chief assassin. After escaping prison, Bullseye attacks and impales Elektra on her own sai. This fails to convince the Kingpin, who says he will only be rehired if Bullseye kills Daredevil. Bullseye attempts to ambush Daredevil, but their battle ends with his arch-foe dropping him from atop a telephone wire. The multi-story fall breaks Bullseye's back, paralyzing him.

During Bullseye's extended hospital stay following the fall, Daredevil breaks into his hospital room and forces him to participate in a two-man variation on Russian roulette. The revolver used in the game is secretly unloaded, but Daredevil has Bullseye take the even-numbered turns so that he would feel sure that the last shot is going to kill him. Bullseye has repeatedly cited this incident as his greatest grudge against Daredevil.

Japanese scientist Lord Dark Wind liberates Bullseye and has him brought to Japan, lacing his bones with adamantium and thus restoring his mobility. Lord Dark Wind did this so that Bullseye would work as an assassin in return, but in spite of this favor being done for him, Bullseye refuses to work for free. He instead makes another play to regain the position of the Kingpin's chief assassin once again if he kills Daredevil, knowing he would fail. Bullseye is imprisoned for several years.

Bullseye eventually escapes prison, and then battles Captain America. He battles Crossbones in an attempt to assassinate the Red Skull to regain his old position with the Kingpin.

After encountering the amnesiac Daredevil, he takes advantage of this by impersonating Daredevil and committing robberies in an attempt to destroy his nemesis's image. In one of his early heists, he is caught by his mark's disillusioned trophy wife. He becomes enamored of the wife who pleads with him to be taken away by him, but he keeps the wife in his derelict hideout as his lover, attempting to flatter her by showering her with stolen money and jewelry. However, the woman comes to realize that he is mentally weak and, frightened by one of his psychotic outbursts, leaves him. Gradually, Bullseye becomes so immersed in his Daredevil impersonation that he believes himself to truly be Daredevil, a confusion which the real hero takes advantage of to defeat him.

Bullseye later has another run-in with the Punisher when he is part of Frank's frame-up scheme that ends with Bullseye getting both of his hands shot and losing a finger to the Punisher's brutality. Bullseye encounters Deadpool and Gambit during another long interval in which the character was seldom used.

Bullseye is hired by the villain Mysterio to attack and confuse Daredevil. In the course of their battle, Bullseye kills Karen Page (Daredevil's long-time love interest) with one of Daredevil's own billy clubs.

Bullseye is recruited to steal the Identity Disc, purported to be in possession of A.I.M. and have vital information on the world's superheroes, along with Deadpool, Sabretooth, Vulture, and Juggernaut.

Bullseye offers to kill Daredevil for Kingpin, later entering Daredevil's apartment and attempting to kill Milla Donovan (Daredevil's new girlfriend). Enraged and already near the breaking point, Daredevil attacks Bullseye and throws him out the window. During the fight, the hero reveals to Bullseye that he knows his real name Lester, his mother was a prostitute, and that he never knew his father. He mocks the assassin's new 'Bullseye' tattoo and carves a new one over it with a rock.

Bullseye seeks purported documents confirming Daredevil's secret identity. After a brutal fight with Daredevil and Elektra, Bullseye flees into open traffic where he is hit by a truck, sustaining severe injuries.

Thunderbolts

Bullseye, along with many other villains, is recruited into the Thunderbolts by Iron Man and Mister Fantastic to hunt down anti-registration superheroes in the Civil War storyline. Afterwards, he is recruited by Norman Osborn into the reformed team led by Moonstone. He operates invisibly and is not seen by the public. He is used as a last resort and has a nano-chain fed into his system, so if he disobeys orders, he will receive an electrical shock.

Bullseye fights American Eagle after having been deceived by Songbird and told that his nano-chain is disabled. During the fight, he simultaneously receives an electrical shock from the nano-chain in his system on order of Moonstone and is attacked by American Eagle. American Eagle beats him severely, mocking him throughout for purposely avoiding fights with superpowered foes, and finally breaks Bullseye's neck. As a result of the damage sustained from both being attacked by a man with superhuman strength and being shocked by the nano-chain, Bullseye is paralyzed, is unable to speak, and has incurred severe brain injuries. Bullseye is later shown walking due to nanomechanical surgery, then goes on a killing spree using scalpels to "get some target practice in". Later, he joins the Thunderbolts in their efforts to assassinate Moon Knight.

Bullseye was with the Thunderbolts when they fought the Skrulls in Washington DC. He took advantage of the clone of Andrea von Strucker being distracted by Moonstone to kill Andrea, and nearly killed Moonstone in the process. Bullseye travels along with the other Thunderbolts to Central Park and joins the final battle against the main Skrull force. Obtaining a missile launcher from the Zeus, he fires a rocket through the Skrull Yellowjacket's right eye, thus disabling the Skrull from engaging with other heroes. Osborn orders Bullseye to kill Songbird, finally giving Bullseye the chance for revenge. Bullseye nearly succeeds, but is incapacitated by the Swordsman helping Songbird escape.

Dark Avengers

As a reward for his role during the Skrull invasion, Bullseye is placed on the Dark Avengers and given the costume and codename of Hawkeye.

On the Dark Avengers' first mission, he kills Morgana le Fey only for the sorceress to return yet again with an army of demons.

When the Dark Avengers fight a rogue Hulkbuster robot, "Hawkeye" disables the robot after killing its pilot. When the robot falls and kills 36 civilians, Osborn reprimands Bullseye for his part in the deaths, to which Bullseye demands credit for his kills. "Hawkeye" then goes out and saves a woman from being attacked by three men. He kills the men, and the woman inadvertently infuriates him by referring to Osborn as "his boss". After he kills the woman, he notices a news crew in a helicopter filming the action. He silences the news crew by blowing up the helicopter.

Bullseye is used to take out his old partner Deadpool. Deadpool eventually gains the upper hand and stabs Bullseye through the chest with a meat hook, who later wakes up in a hospital and goes after Deadpool again. Deadpool easily avoids Bullseye's attacks, then runs Bullseye down, stopping with one of the vehicle's tires on Bullseye's leg. Bullseye pays off Deadpool (under the pretense that Osborn told him to do so) to save himself.

Elektra stabs Bullseye with his own arrow.

Bullseye is later given the order by Osborn to eliminate Daredevil, who has been discovered leading the Hand. Daredevil (who is going through the trials needed to join the Hand) and Bullseye clash. Bullseye booby-traps a building with 100 people in it. Daredevil continues to battle Bullseye unaware that the building is rigged and that Bullseye has the detonator. When the building explodes, Bullseye escapes and leaves Daredevil to his grief, mocking that if Daredevil had chosen to kill him the people in the building might have been saved.

Molecule Man turns Bullseye into a pool of water to subdue him; however, as a liquid he still tries to attack Molecule Man. He is restored by the Sentry. He is also part of the team when they go to Manhattan to look for Noh-Varr. The Sentry finds him first but is distracted and leaves the battle later to find Noh-Varr gone.

Osborn later assigns Bullseye with the duty to kill Lindy Reynolds (Sentry's wife). He takes Lindy for a helicopter ride, and strangles and dumps Lindy's body in the ocean. When the Sentry questions him about Lindy's whereabouts, Bullseye claims Lindy committed suicide over the countryside by jumping out of the copter, and the Sentry flies off to find Lindy.

Shadowland
In the aftermath of Siege, Bullseye is incarcerated and sent to the Raft. But in the process of being transferred there, he manages to kill his captors and escapes. He makes his way back to Hell's Kitchen and arrives at Shadowland, Daredevil's fortress, and is confronted by Daredevil and a legion of Hand ninjas. Bullseye is unprepared for his enemy's newfound ruthlessness as Daredevil dislocates both his shoulders and then stabs him through the heart with his own sai, in much the same way Bullseye had killed Elektra years before. Later, a group of Hells Bikers put together an unauthorized funeral service (as J. Jonah Jameson had expressly forbade) for Bullseye; Ben Urich is dragged along, as well as Danny Deaver. However, Deaver continually sees visions of Bullseye; it is not clear whether or not it is Bullseye's spirit or simply part of Deaver's psychosis. Bullseye's funeral service is interrupted by Daredevil and the Hand and a massive brawl breaks out, almost killing Urich. Daredevil later exhumes Bullseye's corpse, intending to resurrect him as a soldier loyal to the Hand. The heroes interrupt the ceremony- Spider-Man explicitly noting that the only thing worse than killing Bullseye is the idea of bringing him back- preventing Bullseye's resurrection.

Return
It was later revealed that Bullseye was still barely alive as his body disappeared after the battle, but he has become an invalid due to his injuries who has to rely on a metal lung to survive. To get revenge, he is revealed to be the mastermind behind Klaw, Coyote, and Ikari's actions against Daredevil. He is later found by the hero who defeated Ikari and Lady Bullseye. The warehouse where they were is subsequently destroyed, and Bullseye is nearly drowned in radioactive waste, leaving him scarred and blind.

Bullseye would go on to have his body fully repaired by the Hand in an encounter with Elektra.

During the "Secret Wars" storyline, Bullseye is among the villains attending the Kingpin's viewing party of the incursion between Earth-616 and Earth-1610.

During the "Infinity Wars" storyline, Bullseye is among the villains that accompany Turk Barrett to his meeting with the Infinity Watch at Central Park.

When Daredevil's protégé Blindspot was left blinded by the villain Muse, Matt Murdock put out a bounty on himself out of guilt, attracting the attention of Bullseye and several other supervillains. Daredevil beat Bullseye and then revealed that he had put the contract out in hopes of luring Bullseye, as Blindspot's condition reminded Daredevil of the murder of Karen Page.

Hired by the Hood, Bullseye impersonates Ronin to commit crimes to ruin Hawkeye's reputation, however, Clint Barton uses Bullseye's identity and defeats the psychotic killer.

After the War of the Realms, Bullseye steals Dragonfang, mystical sword of the deceased Valkyrie, and uses it to mortally wound Heimdall. This earns him the enmity of the current Valkyrie, Jane Foster, who stops Bullseye by destroying Dragonfang.

Powers and abilities
Bullseye has an innate ability to throw virtually any object as a projectile with incredible accuracy and with enough force to be lethal. Some of his accomplishments include lacerating a person's throat with a thrown playing card, spitting his own tooth through a human skull, tossing a paper airplane to a distant rooftop, cutting a person's throat with a straw, killing four people with screws, and killing a person with a toothpick thrown through a window from a hundred yards away. Aside from his ability to throw projectiles with lethal accuracy, Bullseye is also a skilled hand-to-hand combatant, and has been trained in Karate. He is also extremely talented in the use of edged/throwing weapons and conventional firearms. Bullseye has exceptional physical conditioning, with the agility, reflexes, stamina, and speed of a professional athlete. Bullseye also has a high pain tolerance.

After falling from a building, many of Bullseye's bones were reinforced with strips of adamantium. This has increased his resistance to injury in unarmed combat and allows him to perform acrobatic maneuvers that would fracture ordinary human bones. Unlike Wolverine, whose adamantium was implanted using stolen and incomplete notes on the bonding process and who survived only because of his mutant healing factor, Bullseye's surgery was performed properly by Lord Dark Wind himself, and thus included the special herb treatment which prevents the body from being destroyed by the implantation.

Bullseye has a compulsive need to study his targets' histories, abilities, and relationships before engaging them. He employs this information to attempt to anticipate his opponents' movements in combat. This compulsion often crosses from the professional into the personal, such as Bullseye's obsession with Elektra. Due to a mutual head injury, Bullseye was able to sense Daredevil's presence psychically for a brief time.

Reception
Bullseye was 20th in IGN's list of the "Top 100 Comic Book Villains of All Time", and 35th in their list of "The Top 50 Avengers".

Other versions

Age of Apocalypse

In the 1994 arc of a different timeline called Age of Apocalypse, Bullseye is seen as one of the humans' greatest soldiers. Using a machine gun and hitting every enemy target, he fights on the side of good. He does not wear his original costume, and does not act insane.

Mutant X
A version of Bullseye appears in the Mutant X continuity, also a notorious supervillain. Bullseye shows up at the courthouse to assassinate The Brute when The Brute is on trial for murder charges. He is beaten by Elektra.

PunisherMAX

A version of Bullseye appears in Jason Aaron's run on PunisherMax starting with issue #6. This version of Bullseye is hired by the Kingpin to kill the Punisher. He does not wear a costume but has a bullseye tattooed on his forehead. Although his abilities are more realistic than in the mainstream Marvel continuity, he is still a very talented marksman and a deadly fighter, proficient with a variety of weapons. His real name is Shelton Pendergrass.

This version is psychopathic/sociopathic and shows extreme obsessive compulsive tendencies toward his targets. He is said to have gassed an entire elementary school when some children were witness to a mob hit and then killed the rest of the town with bombs at the mass funeral. Obsessing with getting inside the Punisher's head, Bullseye kills the father of a suburban family and takes the wife and children hostage, putting himself in the role of their new husband and father. He then arranges for gunmen to kill the family in front of him to recreate The Punisher's origin. He fails to feel why The Punisher was upset by this occurrence. Off-panel Bullseye repeats the same experiment with three more families.

Eventually, Bullseye realizes what was the last thing the Punisher said to his wife. This realization sends the Punisher into shock and sends a near-death Bullseye into a smiling coma. Later, Punisher finds Bullseye's coma bed and shoots him in the head.

Marvel 1602
In the Marvel 1602 universe (Earth-311), Bull's Eye appears as an assassin/first mate for the villainous Captain Wilson Fiske (The King's Pin). He is heavily tattooed around the face and arms, and possesses the mainstream Bullseye's abilities. He is sent by his captain with orders to kill Peter Parquagh aka the 1602 version of Spider-Man. He is attacked by the 1602 version of the Lizard and presumably perishes.

House of M
A version of Bullseye who appears in the House of M reality is in the employ of Wilson Fisk, alongside several other assassins. He is tasked with killing Black Cat when the Kingpin decides to reveal the Black Cat as a traitor. He also assists the Brotherhood in taking out sapien groups throughout the city, specifically targeting Shang-Chi's Dragons, killing Swordsman in the conflict. In the confrontation with the Avengers, Hawkeye shoots him in his hands.

Marvel Zombies
In Marvel Zombies, a zombified Bullseye appears alongside several other undead supervillains attacking and attempting to eat the invading Galactus.

Ultimate Marvel
The Ultimate Marvel version of Bullseye is named Benjamin Poindexter, first appearing in Ultimate Elektra. He works as the Kingpin's prime assassin until Elektra beats him in direct hand-to-hand combat. He employs disguises on his hits and dons a variation of his regular Marvel Universe incarnation's costume (sans mask) at one point. He has a bulls-eye tattoo on his forehead, similar to his mainstream counterpart's tattoo and later scarring and his movie counterpart's brand. He also has a bulls-eye tattoo on his chest over his heart. Benjamin was also alluded in the issue of Ultimate Spider-Man on the list of known cat burglars in Daily Bugle database.

Amalgam Comics
In the Amalgam Comics continuity, Bullseye is combined with DC Comics's Deadshot to create Deadeye.

Daredevil Noir
In Daredevil Noir, Bullseye is a woman named Eliza. She is Daredevil's love interest until her identity as the Bullseye Killer is revealed in issue #3. Daredevil battles her and the two fall into the sea, but Daredevil still loves her and is unable to kill her. Eliza is left on the docks unconscious and taken into police custody.

1872
During the Secret Wars storyline, a Wild West version of Bullseye resides on the Battleworld domain of the Valley of Doom. He works for Governor Roxxon alongside Elektra, Grizzly, and Otto Octavius. Bullseye and his fellow crooks were first seen having been sent by Governor Roxxon to intimidate Judge Franklin Nelson into leaving town so that the latter would not preside over Red Wolf's trial. Sheriff Steve Rogers and Red Wolf later fight Bullseye, Elektra, Grizzly, and Octavius when they are ordered by Mayor Wilson Fisk into killing Red Wolf. While Sheriff Rogers was able to incapacitate Bullseye following Octavius's death, he briefly recovers where he manages to shoot Sheriff Rogers starting to expose Mayor Fisk's corruption. When Red Wolf faces off against Bullseye, Elektra, and Grizzly again, Red Wolf manages to defeat the three villains.

Old Man Logan
In Old Man Hawkeye, a prequel to the Old Man Logan comic, Bullseye appears as a Marshal who works for the Red Skull and goes against his superior's orders to track down Hawkeye as he has missed the thrill of fighting a superhero for the last couple of decades. This version has a cybernetic eye implant that increases his aiming abilities.

In Old Man Logan's flashback, Mysterio used an illusion of Bullseye and other villains to trick Wolverine into killing his fellow X-Men. The Bullseye illusion was used on Jubilee by the time Wolverine unintentionally killed her.

What If?
In What If Daredevil Lived in Feudal Japan?, Matt "Bullseye" Murdock was a 19th-century sharpshooter and the great-great-grandfather of millionaire playboy and bestselling author Matthew Murdock. In 1857, Matt served as a cabin boy on the first American naval vessel to visit Japan. The entire crew besides Matt was killed by The Devil Who Dares, a ronin forced into service by the Giant Shogun in return for restoring his blinded son's sight. The Shogun planned to steal the ship's cargo of gunpowder and ammunition; however, Matt detonated the explosives and destroyed the ship, escaping in a lifeboat. He returned to America and served in the Civil War, becoming an expert marksman. He was hired by the Shogun as a mercenary to kill the Devil's son, who had adopted his father's identity. Realising that the Shogun was the true architect of his friend's deaths and troubled when the Shogun ordered him to kill the Devil's partner Elektra in cold blood, Bullseye stood by and allowed Devil to kill him. Bullseye became the Devil's friend and was eventually appointed the first American ambassador to Japan. His great-great-grandson wrote a best selling novel based on the Devil's adventures.

In other media

Television

Benjamin "Dex" Poindexter appears in the third season of Daredevil, portrayed by Wilson Bethel as an adult, Cameron Mann as a child, and Conor Proft as a teenager. This version is an FBI agent with diagnosed mental health issues who previously served in the U.S. Army before joining the FBI as a sniper. After drawing the Kingpin's attention while protecting the latter from assailants, he is manipulated into donning a replica Daredevil suit and carrying out hits in an attempt to both impugn the real Daredevil's reputation and neutralize threats to the Kingpin's resurgence as a crime lord. While operating as Daredevil, Poindexter battles the real Daredevil twice, forms a relationship with a civilian named Julie before the Kingpin has her killed to manipulate Poindexter further, and kills his former partner, Agent Ray Nadeem, on Vanessa Marianna's orders. Upon learning from Daredevil that he was being manipulated, Poindexter crashes the Kingpin and Marianna's wedding reception to seek revenge. He subsequently fights Daredevil and the Kingpin before the latter defeats Poindexter, breaking his back in the process. Afterwards, Poindexter undergoes an experimental surgery to restore his spine.

Film
Colin Farrell portrayed Bullseye in the 2003 film Daredevil. This version has an Irish background and his traditional costume was dropped in favor of a biker/metalhead style appearance and a shaved head with a bullseye branding on his forehead. Additionally, he primarily wields shurikens, though he also uses other small objects with as much ease. Prior to the film's release, the comic book version adopted a near-identical appearance, but has since reverted to the traditional look, retaining only the scar. Director Mark Steven Johnson credited Joe Quesada for talking him out of using the traditional costume. Additionally, Farrell, who adopted an American accent for most of his previous films, was encouraged to keep his Irish accent. He also had to read Frank Miller's Daredevil comics to understand Bullseye "because the expression on the character's faces in the comic books, and just the way they move sometimes, and the exaggerations of the character I'm playing [...] he's so over-the-top that you do draw from that. But it's not exactly a character you can do method acting for... you know, running around New York killing people with paper clips." Bullseye is hired by the Kingpin to kill Nikolas Natchios. While carrying out the hit, Bullseye fights Daredevil, who he sees as a personal challenge as the latter is the first target he ever missed, before successfully killing Nikolas along with his daughter Elektra Natchios. Daredevil and Bullseye's subsequent fight takes them to a church, where the former eventually maneuvers the latter into having his hands shot by an ESU sniper before throwing Bullseye out of a window and onto Ben Urich's car. Following this, Bullseye is hospitalized, but maintains use of his expert marksmanship skills.

Video games
 Bullseye appears in The Punisher, voiced by Steve Blum. This version is an enforcer for the Kingpin.
 Bullseye appears in Lego Marvel Super Heroes, voiced by Dave Boat.
 Bullseye appears in Marvel Heroes, voiced by Rick D. Wasserman. 
 The Old West incarnation of Bullseye appears as a playable character in Lego Marvel Super Heroes 2.
 Bullseye appears in Marvel Ultimate Alliance 3: The Black Order, voiced again by Steve Blum.

Miscellaneous
 Bullseye appears in the HeroClix collectible miniatures game.
 "Ben" Bullseye appears in the Adi Shankar's Bootleg Universe short fan film Venom: Truth In Journalism, portrayed by Derek Mears. He agrees to allow a documentary film crew shadow him on his assassinations.
 Bullseye was announced for the Marvel Crisis Protocol miniatures game.

Collected Editions

As Hawkeye

References

External links
 
 
 

Characters created by John Romita Sr.
Characters created by Marv Wolfman
Comics characters introduced in 1976
Daredevil (Marvel Comics) characters
Fictional assassins in comics
Fictional contract killers
Fictional baseball players
Fictional blade and dart throwers
Fictional characters from The Bronx
Fictional characters with cancer
Fictional characters with schizophrenia
Fictional Federal Bureau of Investigation personnel
Fictional marksmen and snipers
Fictional mass murderers
Fictional Nicaraguan Revolution veterans
Fictional prison escapees
Fictional victims of domestic abuse
Marvel Comics film characters
Marvel Comics male supervillains
Marvel Comics martial artists
Marvel Comics supervillains
Video game bosses